Fostervoll is a surname. Notable people with the surname include:

Alv Jakob Fostervoll (1932–2015), Norwegian politician
Finn Kristen Fostervoll (born 1939), Norwegian diplomat
Kaare Fostervoll (1891–1981), Norwegian educator and politician

Norwegian-language surnames